Lirula is a genus of fungi within the Rhytismataceae family. The genus contains seven species.

References

External links
Lirula at Index Fungorum

Leotiomycetes